Jonas Fjeld (born Terje Lillegård Jensen; 24 September 1952) is a Norwegian singer, songwriter, and guitarist. He is best known in the English-speaking world for two albums recorded by Danko/Fjeld/Andersen, a collaboration with Canadian Rick Danko of The Band and American singer-songwriter Eric Andersen. Fjeld also recorded three albums with the American bluegrass group Chatham County Line.

Biography
Fjeld took his stage name from the principal character of a series of novels written by Øvre Richter Frich. Although he was born in Bodø, he moved with his family to Drammen, Norway when he was a child.

Fjeld's first recording contract was with the Jonas Fjeld Rock 'n' Rolf Band, a comedy band which included Herodes Falsk, in 1972. He switched to acoustic folk after listening to Eric Andersen's album Blue River. His first solo album, was released in 1975. The album  (Big Enough for Me), released in 1990, went gold in Norway. It included Engler i sneen (Angels in the Snow), a duet with Lynni Treekrem.

Fjeld was introduced to Rick Danko by Andersen in 1990. Danko, Fjeld, and Anderson started doing concerts in September 1990, and recorded the eponymous Danko/Fjeld/Andersen album in Norway in 1991. This album included a bilingual version of Engler i sneen (Angels in the Snow) and two more songs co-written by Fjeld, When Morning Comes to America and Blue Hotel.

Fjeld was introduced to Chatham County Line in 2005, and was sufficiently impressed with them to invite them to Norway for some concerts. Fjeld and Chatham County Line have toured together, and recorded two albums, both of which went gold in Norway.

In 2019, he released the album Winter Stories with the famous American singer Judy Collins and Chatham County Line. It reached number one on the Billboard Top Bluegrass Albums list, becoming the first American album ever to give Collins first place on any list, despite all the years she has been in the business. It was the first Billboard top for Fjeld and the third for Chatham County Line.

Fjeld has received four Spellemannprisen, the Norwegian equivalent of a Grammy, he was inducted into the Rockheim Hall of Fame in 2020.

Discography
Jonas Fjeld Rock 'n' Rolf Band
 Jonas Fjeld Rock 'n' Rolf Band (1973)
  (1974)
  (1974)
  (1976)

Jonas Fjeld Band
  (1977)
  (1978)
  (1979)
  (1984)
  (1985)

Jonas Fjeld (solo album)
  (1975)
  (1977)
  (1983)
  (with Ingrid Bjoner and Ola B. Johannessen)
  (with Sidsel Endresen)
  (1990)
  (1992)
  (1994) (live)
  (1999) (greatest hits)
  (2000)
  (2001)
  (2002)
  (2006)
  (2009) (with Henning Kvitnes)
  (2011)
 De beste – 60 år i livet, 40 år på veien (2012)

Danko Fjeld Andersen
 Danko/Fjeld/Andersen (1991)
 Ridin' on the Blinds (1993)
  (2001) (greatest hits)

with Chatham County Line
  (2007) (live)
  (2009)
  (2013)

with Judy Collins and Chatham County Line
 Winter Stories (2019)

To Rustne Herrer
  (1996)
  (1997)
  (2002)
Hvis helsa holder – The Album (2016)

Bratland/Fjeld/Saugestad/Larsen
 (1995)

References

External links 
 Rocksport Booking page Tour dates
 

1952 births
Living people
Norwegian folk guitarists
Norwegian male guitarists
Norwegian folk singers
Norwegian male singers
Spellemannprisen winners
Grappa Music artists
Musicians from Bodø